Route 334, also known as Joe Batt's Arm Road, is a  north–south highway on Fogo Island in the Canadian province of Newfoundland and Labrador. It serves as the only roadway access to the eastern half of the island.

Route description

Route 334 begins in Fogo Island Central at an intersection with Route 333 (Fogo Island Road). It heads northeast to wind its along the island’s northern coastline to pass through the communities of Shoal Bay, Barr'd Islands, and Joe Batt's Arm before turning southeast and more inland for several kilometres. The highway then rejoins the coastline shortly before entering Tilting, where it winds its way through town before coming to an end at the town’s main harbour.

Major intersections

References

334